Rabah Mustapha Madjer (born 15 December 1958) is an Algerian former professional footballer who played as a striker.

He reached stardom as a Porto player during the 1980s, being widely regarded as one of the best Algerian football players of all time. With that club he won nine major titles during his six-year spell, including three national championships and the 1987 European Cup.

One of the most prolific Algeria internationals in number of games and goals, Madjer played in two World Cups with his national team, helping it to its first ever participation in 1982. Having taken up coaching immediately after retiring, he managed several clubs, and also had several spells with the Algeria national team.

Club career
Born in the Algiers district of Hussein Dey of Kabyle origin (Tigzirt), Madjer started his European career in 1983, moving to Racing Club de France football Colombes 92 from local NA Hussein Dey. He stayed there during one and a half seasons, finishing 1984–85 with another French side, Tours FC.

Madjer arrived at FC Porto in 1985–86 and, the following campaign, entered the club's history books in the final of the European Cup against Bayern Munich, scoring the 1–1 equalizer in a memorable final, which eventually ended 2–1 to the Portuguese, and also setting up the winner of Juary. Pelé is believed  to have said of this goal: "It would have been the greatest goal I have ever seen, if he had not looked back at it." He also netted in the club's Intercontinental Cup conquest the same year.

After that stellar 1987, Madjer won the Ballon
d'or Africain, but was not allowed to compete for the European Golden Ball as he was not born in the region. In the first part of 1987–88 he scored ten times from only 11 appearances. In the summer 1988 he moved to Inter Milan but the medical exams detected a serious thigh muscle injury that the player had in the past and the contract was never officially signed (despite the initial announcement and the official photos already taken).

After being close to transferring to Bayern Munich, Madjer signed for La Liga's Valencia CF in January 1988, returning to his previous team after only a few months for a further three seasons. Johan Cruyff had also attempted to sign Madjer for AFC Ajax at the time the clubs met in the 1987 European Super Cup. Cruyff was unhappy with his own club's board, believing that they leaked details of the transfer which caused Porto to pull out of the deal.

Madjer retired from the game in 1992 at the age of nearly 34, after a brief stint with Qatar SC.

International career
Madjer played for the Algeria national team for 19 years, and was present at the 1982 and 1986 FIFA World Cup finals. He retired as the nation's top goalscorer at 28, in 87 caps, having also won the Africa Cup of Nations in 1990 as the hosts incidentally beat Nigeria twice, in the opening match 5–1 and the final 1–0.

Madjer's most famous goal came in Algeria's 2–1 win over Germany in the 1982 World Cup, when he opened the scoring in the 53rd minute.

Post-playing career
In 1993, Madjer began coaching the Algeria national team but after failing to qualify for two 1994 major competitions, the World Cup and the CAN, he resigned, returning to Porto as a youth coordinator.

He subsequently managed Qatari clubs Al Sadd SC (1997–1998) and Al-Wakrah Sport Club (1998–1999).

After a quick spell with the Algeria national team in 1999, Madjer returned two years later, only to resign with aggravation in the 2002 summer.

In 2005 he was appointed coach of Qatari club Al Rayyan SC.

He controversially returned to the post of Algeria national team coach in October 2017, his first managerial work for over a decade, after Lucas Alcaraz failed to take the team to the 2018 FIFA World Cup. The following June he was dismissed, having won twice in seven games of which six were friendlies.

After his coaching spells, Madjer started a career as a professional analyst in Qatar, for Al-Jazeera Sports (beIN Sports now).

In 2011 he became a UNESCO Goodwill Ambassador.

Career statistics

Club

International
Scores and results list Algeria's goal tally first, score column indicates score after each Madjer goal.

Honours
Hussein Dey
Algerian Cup: 1978–79
African Cup Winners' Cup: Runner-up 1978

Porto
Primeira Liga: 1985–86, 1987–88, 1989–90
Taça de Portugal: 1987–88, 1990–91
Supertaça Cândido de Oliveira: 1986, 1990
European Cup: 1986–87
Intercontinental Cup: 1987

International
Africa Cup of Nations: 1990
Afro-Asian Cup of Nations: 1991
African Games: 1978

Individual
Africa Cup of Nations Team of the Tournament: 1982, 1990
African Footballer of the Year: 1987
Intercontinental Cup: Most Valuable Player of the Match Award 1987
European Cup top scorer: 1987–88
Best player of the Africa Cup of Nations: 1990
IFFHS World Player of the Century #62: 2000 
Arab Footballer of the 20th century: 2004
Algerian Footballer of the 20th century: 2009 (with Lakhdar Belloumi)
Algerian Footballer of the Year: Several awards
African Footballer of the 20th century: Fifth place
Golden Foot Legends Award: 2011
IFFHS Legends: 2016

References

External links

1958 births
Living people
People from Hussein Dey (commune)
Algerian footballers
Association football forwards
Algerian Ligue Professionnelle 1 players
NA Hussein Dey players
Ligue 1 players
Ligue 2 players
Racing Club de France Football players
Tours FC players
Primeira Liga players
FC Porto players
La Liga players
Valencia CF players
Qatar Stars League players
Qatar SC players
Algeria youth international footballers
Algeria international footballers
1982 FIFA World Cup players
1986 FIFA World Cup players
1980 African Cup of Nations players
1982 African Cup of Nations players
1984 African Cup of Nations players
1986 African Cup of Nations players
1990 African Cup of Nations players
1992 African Cup of Nations players
Africa Cup of Nations-winning players
Olympic footballers of Algeria
Footballers at the 1980 Summer Olympics
African Games gold medalists for Algeria
African Games medalists in football
Algerian expatriate footballers
Expatriate footballers in France
Expatriate footballers in Portugal
Expatriate footballers in Spain
Expatriate footballers in Qatar
Algerian expatriate sportspeople in France
Algerian expatriate sportspeople in Portugal
Algerian expatriate sportspeople in Spain
Algerian expatriate sportspeople in Qatar
African Footballer of the Year winners
Algerian football managers
Algeria national football team managers
2002 African Cup of Nations managers
Expatriate football managers in Qatar
Competitors at the 1978 All-Africa Games
21st-century Algerian people
UEFA Champions League top scorers
20th-century Algerian people